The Anzaldo Formation is a Katian geologic formation of central Bolivia. The formation belongs to the Cochabamba Group, overlies the Capinota Formation and is overlain by the San Benito Formation.

Fossil content 
The formation has provided the following fossils:

Fish 
Pteraspidomorphi
 Huemacaspis bistrami
 Sacabambaspis janvieri

Trilobites 
 Leiostegina inexpectans

Bivalves 

 ?Grammysia sp.
 ?Modiomorpha sp.
 ?Parallelodon sp.
 "Ctenodonta" sp.
 "Goniophorina" sp.

Gastropods 
 Gyrospira tourteloti

Lingulida 
 Bistramia elegans
 Dignomia munsterii

See also 

 List of fossiliferous stratigraphic units in Bolivia
 Cancañiri Formation
 La Ciénega Formation
 Santiago Formation

References

Bibliography 

 
 
 
 

Geologic formations of Bolivia
Ordovician System of South America
Ordovician Bolivia
Katian
Sandstone formations
Shallow marine deposits
Ordovician southern paleotemperate deposits
Paleontology in Bolivia
Formations